Ursula Myrén (born 30 January 1966) is a Swedish judoka. She competed at the 1992 Summer Olympics and the 1996 Summer Olympics.

References

1966 births
Living people
Swedish female judoka
Olympic judoka of Sweden
Judoka at the 1992 Summer Olympics
Judoka at the 1996 Summer Olympics
Sportspeople from Stockholm
20th-century Swedish women